Rasmus Hämäläinen (born 12 August 1994) is a Finnish former professional ice hockey right winger. He played in the Liiga with KooKoo and SaiPa.

Playing career
Hämäläinen began his career with SaiPa's academy from 2008 to 2014 before moving to SaPKo of Mestis. On 11 September 2017 he joined KooKoo of Liiga on loan and played five games for the team during the 2017–18 Liiga season where he registered one assist.

On 12 April 2018 Hämäläinen joined Ketterä of Mestis. On 31 July 2020 he moved to Slovakia and signed for HC Nové Zámky of the Tipos Extraliga.

References

External links

1994 births
Living people
Finnish ice hockey right wingers
Imatran Ketterä players
KooKoo players
HC Nové Zámky players
People from Lappeenranta
SaiPa players
SaPKo players
Finnish expatriate ice hockey players in Slovakia
Sportspeople from South Karelia